Cornuphallus is a genus of skippers in the family Hesperiidae.

Species
Recognised species in the genus Cornuphallus include:
 Cornuphallus onoribo (Möschler, 1883)

References

Natural History Museum Lepidoptera genus database

Pyrgini
Hesperiidae genera